Michael Campanaro (born January 25, 1991) is a former American football wide receiver. He played college football at Wake Forest and was drafted by the Baltimore Ravens in the seventh round of the 2014 NFL Draft.

Early years
Campanaro attended and played high school football at River Hill High School.

College career
Campanaro attended and played college football at Wake Forest University from 2010–2013. He was redshirted during his first season on campus. In his redshirt freshman season, he served primarily as a return specialist. Campanaro earned a starting position at wide receiver his sophomore year, and recorded 833 yards off of 73 receptions. Alongside Chris Givens, the two teamed up to be the most productive receiving tandem in Wake Forest history. However, injuries sidelined Campanaro for multiple games his junior and senior seasons. He managed to finish sixth in ACC history for career receptions, hauling in 229 passes during his tenure at Wake Forest. He totaled 229 receptions for 2,506 yards and 14 touchdowns in his college football career.

Professional career

Baltimore Ravens

Campanaro was drafted by the Baltimore Ravens in the seventh round (218th overall) of the 2014 NFL Draft. He scored his first career touchdown while simultaneously recording his first career reception in Week 6 against the Tampa Bay Buccaneers on October 12, 2014. He proved to be useful in the Ravens offense until injuring his hamstring in Week 8 against the Cincinnati Bengals. He finished his rookie season with seven receptions for 102 receiving yards and a receiving touchdown.

On October 1, 2015, Campanaro provided the first score of the game for the Ravens with a 9-yard rushing touchdown on an end-around play against Pittsburgh. He was placed on injured reserve on October 3 due to a herniated disc. He finished the 2015 season with five receptions for 35 receiving yards to go along with two rushes for 17 rushing yards and a rushing touchdown in four games.

On September 3, 2016, Campanaro was placed on injured reserve. On September 12, 2016, he was released from injured reserve.

Campanaro was signed to the Ravens' practice squad on November 7, 2016. He was promoted to the active roster on December 14, 2016. In the 2016 season, he finished with three receptions for 106 receiving yards in three games.

On April 6, 2017, Campanaro signed a one-year contract with the Ravens. In Week 6 of the 2017 season, against the Chicago Bears, he recorded a 77-yard punt return touchdown late in the fourth quarter to put the game in position to go to overtime, although the Ravens would ultimately lose 27-24. Over two months later, Campanaro would catch his first touchdown pass in over three years in a 23-16 win over the Indianapolis Colts. In 13 games in the 2017 season, he finished with 19 receptions for 173 receiving yards and one receiving touchdown to go along with five carries for 42 rushing yards.

Tennessee Titans
On April 10, 2018, Campanaro signed a one-year contract with the Tennessee Titans. He was placed on injured reserve on August 26, 2018. He was released on October 23, 2018.

Statistics
Source: NFL.com

References

External links
 Baltimore Ravens bio 
 Wake Forest Demon Deacons bio

1991 births
Living people
People from Howard County, Maryland
Players of American football from Maryland
Sportspeople from Montgomery County, Maryland
People from Silver Spring, Maryland
American football wide receivers
Wake Forest Demon Deacons football players
Baltimore Ravens players
Tennessee Titans players